Donofrio is a surname. Notable people with the surname include:

Beverly Donofrio (born 1951), American writer and teacher
Edward Donofrio (born 1951), American fencer
Heather Daly-Donofrio (born 1969), American golfer 
Nick Donofrio (born 1945), American scientist and engineer